Steadman Marlin (born October 29, 1980) is an American former stock car racing driver. Marlin, the son of Sterling Marlin and grandson of the late Coo Coo Marlin, made his NASCAR debut in 2000.

Racing career

Busch Series
Marlin made his NASCAR debut in 2000 at Nashville Fairgrounds, driving for Felix Sabates' No. 42 Bellsouth Chevrolet. He only managed a start in the 42nd position in a grid of 43. Marlin finished in 30th-place finish, after being involved with 20 other cars in a late-race crash. Marlin then ran eight races in 2001, running for the Sadler Bros' No. 95 Shoney's Ford. His best run was a 19th at Michigan, and had two other top-25 finishes. One of the seven races was for the No. 54 General Creation Chevy, where he crashed to a 42nd place at Memphis Motorsports Park.  Marlin made six more starts in 2002, driving for the Sadler Brothers. His best run was at Kentucky Speedway, where he led his first career laps (7), before late race problems led him to 22nd. In his other five starts, Marlin finished no worse than 30th.

In 2003, Marlin ran seven races in the No. 30 Keystone/Express Personnel Dodge for Braun Racing. His best run in his career was a 15th at California. He also tacked a pair of 24th-place finishes. However, when Braun consolidated to one car, Marlin was left unemployed. Marlin made his next start with a solo run in 2005. This time, Marlin would drive for FitzBradshaw Racing, piloting the No. 12 at Charlotte. He earned another lead lap finish of 19th. Marlin drove for the Sadler Brothers' No. 95 Keystone Light Dodge part-time in 2006. Marlin hasn't raced in NASCAR since.

Craftsman Truck Series
Marlin made his Craftsman Truck Series debut in 2003, driving the No. 9 Billy Ballew Motorsports Ford. He qualified last in the field, 36th. However, Marlin drove a solid first race in the series, coming home with a 22nd-place effort. One year later, Marlin made the first two starts for the new team called Fiddleback Racing. Marlin recorded finishes of 17th and 22nd. Despite this, Marlin did not compete in any more races for the team, and has not raced in the series since.

Personal life
Steadman and his wife Mandi have one son, Sterling Blaise Marlin probably named after Blaise Alexander.

Motorsports career results

NASCAR
(key) (Bold – Pole position awarded by qualifying time. Italics – Pole position earned by points standings or practice time. * – Most laps led.)

Busch Series

Craftsman Truck Series

ARCA Racing Series
(key) (Bold – Pole position awarded by qualifying time. Italics – Pole position earned by points standings or practice time. * – Most laps led.)

References

External links
 

1980 births
Living people
NASCAR drivers
People from Columbia, Tennessee
Racing drivers from Tennessee
ARCA Menards Series drivers